Zawisza Bydgoszcz is a sports club from Bydgoszcz, Poland, founded in 1946. Its name commemorates a legendary Polish 15th-century knight, Zawisza Czarny (Zawisza the Black). The club holds many sections: football, track and field athletics, boxing, rowing, canoeing, weightlifting, gymnastics, shooting, and parachuting ones.

History

The team was founded in 1946, as a military-sponsored club in Koszalin, although they only played friendly matches initially. When the army headquarters moved to Bydgoszcz a year later in 1947 the club followed.

The football team has achieved some successes, playing for several years in the Polish First Division, first winning promotion in 1961.

They reached the semi-finals of the Polish Cup in 1991 and competed in 1993 Intertoto Cup.

Zawisza was relegated from the Second Level to the Fourth Level in the 1997–98 season. In 2001, they controversially merged with Chemik Bydgoszcz, and played as Chemik-Zawisza, whilst the reserve team was initially meant to be called Zawisza-Chemik, although ultimately the reserve team remained as simply "Zawisza". The merger turned out to be very unsuccessful, and the senior side started anew from the bottom of the league pyramid reverting to "Chemik", leaving the reserve team in the fifth division, which subsequently became Zawisza's senior team.

Aside from the ongoing Hydrobudowa scandal between 2006 and 2008, the original team were promoted to the Third Level after finishing 1st in their regional Group of the III liga in the 2007–2008 season. On 12 June 2011, after a 13-year absence, Zawisza was promoted to I liga after finishing second 5 points behind Olimpia Grudziądz in the II liga West Group in the 2010–11 season. In 2013 Zawisza won the I liga and were promoted to the Ekstraklasa.

They won the Polish Cup in the 2013–14 season, 6–5 on penalties after a goalless 120 minutes against Zagłębie Lubin, and qualified for the UEFA Europa League second qualifying round.

After the club had finished 5th in 2015–16 I liga, it did not receive a license for the following season due to financial problems and dissolved. The refounded club SP Zawisza started the 2016–17 season in Klasa B, grupa Bydgoszcz III which is in the 8th tier of Polish football.

Zawisza's under-19 team won the national youth championship in 1981.

Hydrobudowa

Zawisza Bydgoszcz SA was a club that was created when Kujawiak Włocławek were moved to Bydgoszcz and renamed by Hydrobudowa, their owners. The original Zawisza Bydgoszcz continued playing in the fourth division. however the new club had a very similar logo and an identical name. As a result, Kujawiak, Zawisza and supporters all over the country boycotted the relocated team. The reserve team continued to play under the name Kujawiak Włocławek in the Fourth Polish league.

The club lasted two seasons in the Second Division, before it folded in 2007 as a result of serious corruption allegations and widespread condemnation.

Crest
Zawisza's crest has changed several times.

Supporters
The fan movement at Zawisza started in the 1970s, one of the first clubs with organised support in the country. Since then club has always attracted a large support considering its relative lack of success. The club enjoys support from around Cuiavia, with fan-clubs in several other major towns, most notably in Inowrocław, Janikowo, Nakło and Mogilno, among several others.

The fans have good relations with fans of ŁKS Łódź, GKS Tychy, Zagłębie Lubin and Górnik Wałbrzych. Their arch-rivals are fellow locals Polonia Bydgoszcz, with whom they contest the Bydgoszcz Derby, and regional rivals Elana Toruń, with whom they play the Cuiavian Derby, with the Toruń and Bydgoszcz rivalry between the two cities one which goes even beyond sport.

Protests

In the 21st Century, the Zawisza fans have encountered numerous challenges from owners, city council, politicians and the media, frequently battling against them for public support.

First they opposed the controversial merger with Chemik Bydgoszcz in 2001, choosing to boycott the new merged club (which turned out to be hugely unsuccessful) and support the reserve team which still played under the Zawisza name.

In 2006, the fans opposed the new relocated Zawisza, again opting to continue to support the original team made up of the reserve squad. When the "new Zawisza" failed to win any trophies and was embroiled in a match-fixing scandal, subsequently folding, the fans triumphantly announced victory against the media and politicians who supported it.

In 2008, the fans protested against the city council which was insistent on renaming the newly rebuilt stadium as the "Municipal Stadium", with the fans claiming that to omit any link to Zawisza was unfair.

In 2014, the fans began to boycott matches after a match against Widzew Łódź. The fans claim that the police assaulted fans, when preventing Zawisza and ŁKS Łódź fans from entering the stadium. Following the incident, the fans asked to see the security footage, however, the footage was claimed to be lost due to an alleged "technical fault". The club chairman, Radosław Osuch, and a large portion of the media and public opinion, attributed the incident to football hooliganism. The players supported the chairman, sparking fury from the fans. Osuch threatened to relocate the club, and has openly declared war against the fans He changed the club crest to the similar crest used by the relocated Zawisza in 2006, further angering the fans. Since 2014, the boycott has been upheld, meaning that there has been low attendances and support during matches, including the historic Polish Cup win. In January 2015, a group of fans broke into the stadium and placed 15 coffins on the pitch, depicting 14 players and the chairman, and a banner with the words "Osuch's whore spares, you are morally dead", as a protest against the chairman and the players. The club issued a criminal investigation into the incident. In May 2015, after Górnik Łęczna keeper Sergiusz Prusak displayed a T-shirt showing his support to the Zawisza fans, the Zawisza fans decided to break their boycott for one match only to come and thank him in a match against Górnik. In order to prevent the fans from coming to Zawisza, Osuch subsequently raised the match ticket price to a very high 200zł in order to stop the fans attending. After 5 years, Osuch decided to leave the club, however upon this announcement the players and staff also all resigned. Without investment, the club was disbanded by Osuch as last act, stating that there is a poor atmosphere surrounding Polish football. The fans reformed the club and had to start the new season from the lowest level on the football pyramid.

Ground

European record

Current squad
Updated 29 July 2021

Managers

 Antoni Brzeżańczyk (1 July 1957 – 30 June 1958)
 Edward Brzozowski (1963–64)
 Bronisław Waligóra (1971–72), (1974–75)
 Wojciech Łazarek (1 July 1978–79)
 Władysław Stachurski (1 April 1988 – 30 June 1990)
 Adam Topolski (1 May 1991 – 30 June 1992)
 Leszek Jezierski (1992)
 Bogusław Kaczmarek (1 July 1993 – 31 Dec 1993)
 Bronisław Waligóra (1995–96)
 Zbigniew Franiak (1 July 1996 – 1 April 1997)
 Ryszard Lukasik (10 Feb 2007 – 11 April 2007)
 Piotr Tworek (11 April 2007 – 14 March 2009)
 Mariusz Kuras (29 March 2009 – 30 June 2010)
 Maciej Murawski (1 July 2010 – 9 April 2011)
 Adam Topolski (14 April 2011 – 22 June 2011)
 Janusz Kubot (22 June 2011 – 18 April 2012)
 Yuriy Shatalov (19 April 2012 – 26 April 2013)
 Ryszard Tarasiewicz (27 April 2013 – 17 June 2014)
 Jorge Paixão (24 June 2014 – 30 August 2014)
 Mariusz Rumak (1 September 2014 – 8 September 2015)
 Maciej Bartoszek (1 October 2015 – 7 January 2016)
 Zbigniew Smółka (8 January 2016 – 12 June 2016)
 Patryk Zarosa & Dawid Niezbecki (2016)
 Patryk Zarosa (2017 until 30 June) Jacek Łukomski (Since 1 July)
 Przemysław Dachtera (2019 – 2021)
 Piotr Kolc (19 January 2021 – present)

Notable players

Internationally capped players
 Zbigniew Boniek	
 Paweł Kryszałowicz	
 Wojciech Łobodziński
 Adam Majewski	
 Stefan Majewski	
 Piotr Nowak	
 Sławomir Wojciechowski	
 Michał Masłowski
 Igor Lewczuk	
 Vuk Sotirović
 Hérold Goulon

Honours
Polish Cup	
Winners: 2013–14	

Superpuchar Polski
Winners: 2014

References

External links

 Zawisza Bydgoszcz on 90minut.pl

 
Football clubs in Bydgoszcz
Association football clubs established in 1946
1946 establishments in Poland
Military association football clubs in Poland
Military sports clubs
Fan-owned football clubs